BOH or Boh may refer to:

Places 
 Boh (woreda), administrative division of Ethiopia
 Bohemia (BOH is the obsolete country code in FIFA and the International Olympic Committee)
 Bournemouth Airport (IATA code:BOH)
 Southern Bug River or Southern Buh in Ukraine

Other uses 
 Back of house, a term for work operations and spaces not usually visible to customers or guests
 shortened version of the given name Bohumil
 National Bohemian Beer, or Mr. Boh, its former mascot and local cultural icon in Baltimore, Maryland
 3,4-methylenedioxy-beta-methoxyphenethylamine, a drug featured in PiHKAL, and analogue of MDMA
 BOH Plantations Sdn. Bhd., a tea company in Cameron Highlands, Malaysia
 Band of Horses, an American indie rock band
 Back of the House – the kitchen area in food service industry establishments
 Bank of Hawaii
 Bachelor of Oral Health
 Rick Boh, Canadian ice hockey player

See also 
 Boch (disambiguation)